The 2020 New England Revolution season was the team's 25th season of existence, and their 25th season in Major League Soccer, the top-flight of American soccer.

Season Review

On March 12 it was announced that the 2020 Major League Soccer season had been temporarily suspended for 30 days due to the COVID-19 pandemic. On April 17 the MLS announced that the suspension was extended until at least June 8. On May 6, MLS allowed voluntary individual workouts on outdoor fields for the first time since the suspension.

Current squad

Competitions

Exhibitions

MLS

League tables

Eastern Conference

MLS is Back – Group C

Overall

Match results

MLS Cup Playoffs

U.S. Open Cup 

Due to their final standings for the 2019 season, the Revolution were scheduled to enter the competition in the Fourth Round, to be played May 19–20. The ongoing coronavirus pandemic, however, forced the U.S. Soccer Federation to cancel the tournament on August 17, 2020.

References

New England Revolution
New England Revolution
New England Revolution seasons
New England Revolution
Sports competitions in Foxborough, Massachusetts